Cristian Patino (born 3 July 1980 in Argentina) is an Argentinean retired footballer who is last known to have played for Algeciras CF in Spain.

Career

Patino started his senior career with AS Monaco. In 2002, he signed for Raith Rovers in the Scottish Championship, where he made forty-nine appearances and scored three goals. After that, he played for Spanish club Algeciras CF before retiring.

References

External links 
 Patino – I don't want to leave at time like this 
 Football: Rovers exit makes me torn-again Christian; RAITH 2 FALKIRK 0 
 Tristinho Profile 
 NUEVO FICAHJE: CRISTIAN FABIAN PATIÑO
 

Association football defenders
Expatriate footballers in France
Living people
Argentine footballers
1980 births
Algeciras CF footballers
AS Monaco FC players
Expatriate footballers in Scotland
Raith Rovers F.C. players
Argentine expatriate footballers
Unión de Santa Fe footballers
Expatriate footballers in Spain